The following highways are numbered 206:

Canada
 Manitoba Provincial Road 206
 Nova Scotia Route 206
 Prince Edward Island Route 206
 Quebec Route 206

China
 China National Highway 206

Costa Rica
 National Route 206

India
 National Highway 206 (India)

Japan
 Japan National Route 206

United States
 U.S. Route 206
 Alabama State Route 206
 Arkansas Highway 206
 California State Route 206 (former)
 Florida State Road 206
 Georgia State Route 206
 Iowa Highway 206 (former)
 K-206 (Kansas highway)
 Kentucky Route 206
 Maine State Route 206
 M-206 (Michigan highway) (former)
 Montana Secondary Highway 206
 Nevada State Route 206
 New Mexico State Road 206
 New York State Route 206
North Carolina Highway 206 (former)
 Ohio State Route 206
 Oregon Route 206
 Tennessee State Route 206
 Texas State Highway 206
 Texas State Highway Spur 206
 Utah State Route 206 (former)
 Virginia State Route 206
 Washington State Route 206
Territories:
 Puerto Rico Highway 206
 U.S. Virgin Islands Highway 206